Sahabzada Muhammad Mehboob Sultan is a Pakistani politician who had been the  Federal Minister for National Food Security and Research, in office from 5 October 2018 to 18 November 2019. He had been a member of the National Assembly of Pakistan from August 2018 till January 2023.

Previously, he was member of the National Assembly from 2002 to 2013.

Personal life
He is a descendant of Sultan Bahoo.

Political career
Sultan was elected to the National Assembly of Pakistan from Constituency NA-91 (Jhang-VI) as a candidate of Pakistan Muslim League (Q) (PML-Q) in 2002 Pakistani general election. He received 53,545 votes and defeated Faisal Saleh Hayat.

He was re-elected to the National Assembly from Constituency NA-91 (Jhang-VI) as a candidate of PML-Q in 2008 Pakistani general election. He received 75,803 votes and defeated Atta Ullah Khan, a candidate Pakistan Peoples Party (PPP).

He ran for the seat of the National Assembly from Constituency NA-91 (Jhang-III) as a candidate of Pakistan Muslim League (N) (PML-N) in 2013 Pakistani general election, but was unsuccessful. He received 87,048 votes and lost the seat to Najaf Abbas Sial.

In March 2018, he joined Pakistan Tehreek-e-Insaf (PTI).

He was re-elected to the National Assembly from Constituency NA-114 (Jhang-I) as a candidate of PTI in 2018 Pakistani general election. He received 106,043 votes and defeated Faisal Saleh Hayat, a candidate Pakistan Peoples Party (PPP).

On 5 October 2018, Sultan was inducted into the federal cabinet of Prime Minister Imran Khan and was appointed as Federal Minister for National Food Security and Research.

References

External Link

More Reading
 List of members of the 15th National Assembly of Pakistan

Living people
Pakistani MNAs 2008–2013
Pakistani MNAs 2002–2007
Pakistan Muslim League (Q) MNAs
Pakistan Tehreek-e-Insaf MNAs
Pakistani MNAs 2018–2023
1971 births